Marvin José Anieboh Pallaruelo (born 26 August 1997), known as Marvin in Spain, is a professional footballer who plays as a either a central defender or a right back for Segunda Federación club UD Montijo. Born and raised in Spain to a Nigerian father and an Equatorial Guinean mother of partial Spanish descent, he represents Equatorial Guinea internationally.

Early life
Anieboh was born in Madrid to a Nigerian Urhobo father and an Equatoguinean mother. He is of Spanish descent through his maternal grandfather and of Bubi descent through his maternal grandmother.

Club career
After representing AD Alcorcón, Getafe CF and CF Fuenlabrada as a youth, Anieboh made his senior debut for the latter's B-team during the 2016–17 season, in the regional leagues. On 24 June 2017, he was loaned to Tercera División side CD Los Yébenes San Bruno for one year.

On 22 August 2018, Anieboh signed for fellow fourth division side RCD Carabanchel. Ahead of the 2018–19 campaign, he signed for another reserve team, AD Alcorcón B also in division four.

Anieboh made his first team debut for Alkor on 17 December 2019, starting in a 0–1 away loss against CP Cacereño, for the season's Copa del Rey.

International career
Due to his background, Anieboh was eligible to play internationally for Spain, Nigeria or Equatorial Guinea. After representing the latter's under–20s in 2015, he received his first senior call in October 2016 for a friendly match against Lebanon, but he did not play.

Anieboh returned to the Equatorial Guinean squad in 2019 and made his debut on 19 November that year, in a 0–1 loss to Tunisia at the 2021 Africa Cup of Nations qualification Group J.

References

External links

1997 births
Living people
Citizens of Equatorial Guinea through descent
Equatoguinean footballers
Association football fullbacks
Association football central defenders
Utsiktens BK players
Superettan players
Equatorial Guinea international footballers
Equatoguinean expatriate footballers
Equatoguinean expatriate sportspeople in Sweden
Expatriate footballers in Sweden
Equatoguinean people of Nigerian descent
Sportspeople of Nigerian descent
Equatoguinean sportspeople of Spanish descent
People of Bubi descent
Footballers from Madrid
Spanish footballers
CF Fuenlabrada B players
AD Alcorcón B players
AD Alcorcón footballers
CP Cacereño players
Vélez CF players
Tercera División players
Segunda Federación players
Divisiones Regionales de Fútbol players
Spanish expatriate footballers
Spanish expatriate sportspeople in Sweden
Spanish people of Nigerian descent
Spanish sportspeople of African descent
Spanish sportspeople of Equatoguinean descent
Spanish people of Bubi descent